Sukorady is a name of several locations in the Czech Republic:

 Sukorady, a village in the Hradec Králové Region (Jičín District)
 Sukorady, a village in the Central Bohemian Region (Mladá Boleslav District)
 village Sukorady, an administrative part of the village Snědovice, Ústí nad Labem Region (Litoměřice District)